Tyrrhenaria is a genus of air-breathing land snails, terrestrial pulmonate gastropod mollusks in the family Helicidae, the typical snails.

This genus has become a junior synonym of Helix Linnaeus, 1758

Species
Species within the genus Tyrrhenaria include:
 Tyrrhenaria ceratina: synonym of Helix ceratina Shuttleworth, 1843

References

External links 
Animal Base info on one species

Helicidae
Gastropod genera